The von Kármán–Gabrielli diagram (also Gabrielli–von Kármán diagram, GvK diagram) is a diagram which compares the efficiency of transportation methods by plotting specific tractive force, or specific resistance  against velocity.  It was first used by Theodore von Kármán and Giuseppe Gabrielli in their 1950 paper on this subject.

See also
 Ragone plot

References

External links
 Diagram for cargo 
 Diagram of changes from 1950 to 2004

Diagrams
Energy in transport